Rama Rama Raghurama is a 2011 Indian Kannada language film directed by Raghuraj. The music of the film was composed by V. Harikrishna.

Plot  
Raghurama, an honest police constable fails to fulfill his professional and personal responsibilities. Hence, he undertakes series of attempts to end his life on duty.

Cast 

 Rangayana Raghu as Raghurama 
 Lakshmi Sharma 
 Sadhu Kokila as Raghurama's brother-in-law
 Doddanna
 Shobharaj
 Dr. Nagesh Kaveti 
 Friends Haridas G.
 Bullet Prakash 
 Achyuth Kumar 
 Srinivas Gowda 
 Siddesh 
 Sundar Raj 
 Lokanath 
 Arun Sagar 
 Mico Nagaraj 
 M. N. Suresh 
 Mallesh Mysore 
 NGEF Ramamurthy 
 Sangeetha 
 Anil Kumar 
 Raghava Uday 
 Sanchari Vijay

Reception

Critical response 

A critic from The Times of India scored the film at 3 out of 5 stars and says "Lakshmi Sharma impresses you with the small role she plays as a lover. Doddanna, Sundararaj and Loknath give you a good dose of comic relief. Music by V Harikrishna and cinematography by Krishnakumar are okay". A critic from The New Indian Express wrote "In a bizarre twist of fate, the more he tries to end his life the more positive things happen to him. Doddanna has shown some fine acting skills, and Shobaraj is also convincing as a villain. However, Sadhu Kokila and Bullet Prakash failed to impress the audience". A critic from Deccan Herald wrote "A V Krishnakumar’s camerawork is adequate, complimenting Harikrishna’s music. The makers, determined to give a ‘dream debut as hero’ to Raghu ensure that none of the other actors, except the leading lady (!) are mentioned. Still, Achyuta, Bullet, Doddanna, Sadhu Kokila, Lokanath, Shobhraj and even Rachna Maurya shine in their roles. Rama Rama Raghurama may just turn out to be more than standard fare if the India-Ireland match falls flat of expectations". A critic from Bangalore Mirror wrote  "Curiously, the director clubs one scene with another with a prop, not always connected to each other. Though it has nothing to do with the narrative, it hits you and brings out a laughter or two. Shobraj and ‘Uncle’ Loknath stand out with their performances. The music and cinematography are standard fare".

References 

2011 films
2010s Kannada-language films
Films scored by V. Harikrishna